Murtaza Lodhgar (5 May 1976 – 17 September 2021) was an Indian cricketer. He played ten first-class matches for Bengal between 1997 and 2007. He died of cardiac arrest.

See also
 List of Bengal cricketers

References

External links
 

1976 births
2021 deaths
Indian cricketers
Bengal cricketers
People from Patan district
Cricketers from Gujarat